Pungenin is a phenolic compound found in the needles of Blue Spruce (Picea pungens). It is the glucoside of 3,4-dihydroxyacetophenone.

Chemical Ecology
The compound serves a feeding deterrent against Spruce Budworm larvae.

See also
Picein

References

Phenol glucosides
Aromatic ketones